Parankylosauria is a group of basal ankylosaurian dinosaurs known from the Cretaceous of South America, Antarctica, and Australia. It is thought the group split from other ankylosaurs during the mid-Jurassic period, despite this being unpreserved in the fossil record.

History of research

During the Mesozoic era, the southern continents (South America, Antarctica, Australia, and Africa in addition to India and Zealandia) were unified into a supercontinent known as Gondwana. This was in contrast to the supercontinent of Laurasia in the Northern Hemisphere, with both originating from the breakup of Pangaea. Gondwana itself gradually split apart over the course of the Jurassic and Cretaceous eras. Ankylosaurian dinosaurs from Laurasia have historically been far more extensively recorded and studied. Reports of the group in Gondwana date back to 1904, with a specimen from Australia and include referrals of Loricosaurus, Lametasaurus, and Brachypodosaurus to group among assorted fragmentary material. Much of this material including would later be shown to be misidentified and not belonging to ankylosaurs, including the named genera. The first definitive ankylosaur to be recognized from Gondwana was discovered in Australia in 1964 and later named in 1980 as Minmi paravertebra. The possibility of a biogeographic connection between South America and ankylosaurs in Australia was raised alongside discovery, though based on conjecture.

Ankylosaurs from Gondwana have remained very mysterious. Fossil material continues to be scant and southern taxa have been difficult to interpret in a phylogenetic context. Vertebrae of Antarctopelta from Antarctica, for example, were so foreign compared to those of euankylosaurs that it was questioned if they might instead belong to a marine reptile, which would make the genus based on a chimeric specimen. The discovery of the genus Stegouros, published and named in 2021, helped to clear up the previous confusion. The type specimen of the genus preserved enough of the skeleton to make it clear that there was a previously unrecognized monophyletic grouping of these southern ankylosaur taxa. Thus the study naming the genus, by Sergio Soto-Acuña and colleagues, coined Parankylosauria based on the two aforementioned genera and Kunbarrasaurus. The name, referencing its parent group, means "at the side of Ankylosauria".

The Parankylosauria were not the only Gondwanan ankylosaurians; the nodosaurid Patagopelta was described from Argentina in 2022, and has been found to be closely allied with North American nodosaurids in the subfamily Nodosaurinae. This suggests that in addition to the more ancient Parankylosauria, more derived euankylosaurians also inhabited South America, having migrated from North America as part of a biotic interchange during the Campanian.

Anatomy

The most distinctive trait of the group is their macuahuitl, named after the mesoamerican weapon of the same name. This trait is similar to the thagomizer of stegosaurs and tail clubs known in ankylosaurines, though evolved independently from each. This was a structure at the end of the tail formed by a series of five pairs of robust osteoderms (bones in the skin) fused together, surrounding the sides of the tail and surrounding the entirety of it near the tip. This weapon is known directly in the genus Stegouros, suspected based on indirect evidence in Antarctopelta, and not confirmed in Kunbarrasaurus, for which a complete tail is not known. In the former taxon the weapon is associated with dramatic shortening of the tail, made up of far fewer vertebrae than any other kind of thyreophoran. As with many other members of this group, osteoderms would have covered much of the body of parankylosaurs, functioning as spiny armor.

Parankylosaurs, compared to the more well studied euankylosaurs, retain more traits seen in more primitive thyreophorans and stegosaurs. This is most applicable in the body, most distinctively seen in the possession of rather long and slender limbs. The skull, comparatively, is more similar to that of other ankylosaurs, thought to indicate the acquisition of advanced skull traits earlier in ankylosaur evolution. Also unlike euankylosaurs, it is thought, based on the preserved osteoderms of Kunbarrasaurus and lack of flank osteoderms associated with other known genera, that parankylosaurs may not have had rather light coverings of dermal armor compared to their relatives. They possessed a pelvic shield, formed from a thin sheet of bone over the hip region, more reinforced than the superficial shielding of stegosaurs but not as overbuilt as those found in euankylosaurs.

Classification

The clade is phylogenetically defined as all taxa closer to Stegouros than to Ankylosaurus, making it a counterpart to Euankylosauria, which has the opposite definition. The following cladogram is reproduced from the phylogenetic analysis in the 2021 study by Sergio Soto-Acuña and colleagues:

In 2022, a study by Timothy G. Frauenfelder and colleagues on a new specimen (SAMA P40536) tentatively referred to Kunbarrasaurus tested their new specimen in the dataset of the 2021 study, finding a similar placement and composition of Parankylosauria, but also coded the specimen for an older phylogenetic dataset of a 2016 paper by Victoria Arbour and Phil Currie. The resulting analysis found Kunbarrasaurus and the new specimen to nest together in a similar position on the tree to where Parankylosauria was found in the 2021 dataset, supporting that conclusion. The tree of the second dataset is reproduced below:

See also
 Timeline of ankylosaur research

References

Ankylosaurs
Albian first appearances
Maastrichtian extinctions